Sergio Iturriaga (born 3 August 1974) is a Chilean equestrian. He competed in the individual eventing at the 2008 Summer Olympics.

References

External links
 

1974 births
Living people
Chilean male equestrians
Olympic equestrians of Chile
Equestrians at the 2008 Summer Olympics
Equestrians at the 2007 Pan American Games
Equestrians at the 2011 Pan American Games
Equestrians at the 2015 Pan American Games
Sportspeople from Concepción, Chile
Pan American Games competitors for Chile
20th-century Chilean people
21st-century Chilean people